Mishari is an Arabic origin masculine given name. People with the name include:

 Mishari bin Rashid Alafasy (born 1976), Kuwaiti imam  
 Mishari bin Abdulaziz Al Saud (1932–23 May 2000), Saudi Arabian royal and businessman 
 Mishari bin Saud Al Saud (born 1954), Saudi royal and government official

Arabic masculine given names